

The Lioré et Olivier LeO H-43 was a reconnaissance seaplane produced in France in the 1930s. It was a strut-braced, mid-wing monoplane of largely conventional design, provided with an observation balcony underneath the fuselage. It was designed to be launched by catapult from warships and, after a first flight in 1934, trials were conducted on board Commandant Teste.

Development was prolonged and the prototype underwent much modification before an order for 20 machines was placed by the Aéronavale. Even after this, a major redesign to the forward fuselage was specified as part of the production order. As a result, the first test flight of the production version did not take place until 13 July 1939, by which time the H-43 was already obsolete.

The twenty examples purchased briefly equipped two squadrons from February 1940, but all were withdrawn with the Fall of France.

Operators
 
 Aéronavale
 Escadrille 3S1
 Escadrille 3S5

Specifications

See also

Notes

References

 
 

1930s French military reconnaissance aircraft
Floatplanes
H-043
Single-engined tractor aircraft
Mid-wing aircraft
Aircraft first flown in 1934